Neu-Seeland is a municipality in the Oberspreewald-Lausitz district, in Lower Lusatia, Brandenburg, Germany.

History 
From 1815 to 1947, the constituent localities of Neu-Seeland (Bahnsdorf, Lindchen, Lubochow and Ressen) were part of the Prussian Province of Brandenburg. From 1952 to 1990, they were part of the Bezirk Cottbus of East Germany. On 1 February 2002, the municipality of Neu-Seeland was formed by merging the municipalities of Bahnsdorf, Lindchen, Lubochow and Ressen.

Demography

References

Populated places in Oberspreewald-Lausitz